Aldighieri is a surname. Notable people with the surname include:

 Gottardo Aldighieri (1824–1906), Italian operatic baritone
 Maria Spezia-Aldighieri (1828–1907), Italian operatic soprano, wife of Gottardo

Italian-language surnames